Nikolay Vasilyevich Puzanov (7 April 1938 – 3 January 2008) was a Soviet biathlete.

He was a 4 × 7.5 km relay gold medalist at the 1968 Winter Olympics in Grenoble, France.

Biathlon results
All results are sourced from the International Biathlon Union.

Olympic Games
1 medal (1 gold)

World Championships
4 medals (1 gold, 3 silver)

*During Olympic seasons competitions are only held for those events not included in the Olympic program.
**The team (time) event was removed in 1965, whilst the relay was added in 1966.

References

External links
 

1938 births
2008 deaths
Soviet male biathletes
Biathletes at the 1964 Winter Olympics
Biathletes at the 1968 Winter Olympics
Olympic biathletes of the Soviet Union
Medalists at the 1968 Winter Olympics
Olympic medalists in biathlon
Olympic gold medalists for the Soviet Union
Biathlon World Championships medalists
People from Kyshtym
Burials at Serafimovskoe Cemetery